The 2015 Women's World Floorball Championships is the tenth World Championships in women's floorball. The tournament took place in Tampere in Finland in December 2015. Sixteen teams participated.

Sweden won the tournament defeating Finland, 5-4, in the final game following a penalty shootout.

Qualification

All teams, apart from the host country (Finland), will have to qualify for the Final Round via the qualifications, and there will be a total of 5 qualification groups - one in the Americas, one in Asia-Oceania and three in Europe. For Sweden, this will be the first time that they have ever had to participate in any qualification event in any age group. France and New Zealand will be participating in the women's event for the first-ever time, while Great Britain are making a return after a 14-year absence.

Venues

Preliminary round

Group A

Group B

Group C

Group D

Knockout stage

Playoff round

Quarterfinals

Semifinals

Bronze medal game

Gold medal game

Placement round

13th–16th place

9th–12th place

5th–8th place

15th place

13th place

11th place

9th place

7th place

5th place

Statistics

Final ranking

External links
http://www.wfc2015.fi/ Official site

References

2015, Women's
International floorball competitions hosted by Finland
2015 in floorball
2015 in Finnish women's sport
December 2015 sports events in Europe
Sports competitions in Tampere